Malcolm Smith (born March 9, 1941 on Saltspring Island, British Columbia, Canada)  is a Canadian-American off-road racer.

Career
Smith first raced in 1956 atop a 1949 Matchless 500cc motorcycle. Later, he was associated with Husqvarna motorcycles. His renown grew as he won races in the 1960s and 1970s. Smith won eight gold medals between 1966 and 1976 in the International Six Day Trial. The International Six Day Trials, a form of off-road motorcycle Olympics, is the oldest annual competition sanctioned by the FIM dating back to 1913.

He is a six-time winner of the Baja 1000, three times on a motorcycle and three times in a car; a four-time winner of the Baja 500; has twice won the Mint 400 in Nevada and the Roof of Africa Rallye; participated in the Paris Dakar Rally twice; and was the overall winner of the Atlas Rallye in the mountains of Morocco.

Following his racing career, Smith began developing tools and riding gear. Malcolm Smith Gold Medal Products later became Malcolm Smith Racing (later MSR).  MSR was eventually purchased by Tucker Rocky Distributing.  He currently owns a motorsports dealership in Riverside, California with his wife Joyce and 2 of his 4 children, daughters Ashley and Alexandria.
 
Smith was inducted into the Off-road Motorsports Hall of Fame in 1978, the Motorsports Hall of Fame of America in 1996, and the Motorcycle Hall of Fame in 1998.

Racing on film
Smith's talent on two wheels earned him a starring role in Bruce Brown's classic motorcycle documentary, On Any Sunday, alongside screen legend Steve McQueen and American Motorcyclist Association Grand National Champion Mert Lawwill.  The film was nominated for an Academy Award in 1972 for Best Documentary Feature.

He continued to appear in motion pictures, including Naturally Free (1975), Dirt (1979), and On Any Sunday II (1981).  Recently, Malcolm was featured in the 2005 Baja 1000 documentary, Dust to Glory, co-starring Mario Andretti and Robby Gordon.

Off the track
In 2000, Smith created a non-profit foundation dedicated to giving back to Mexico. Every year, Smith hosts a 6-day charity ride to raise money for his schools and orphanages.  Malcolm has been married 3 times and has four children.

References

External links
 Malcolm Smith's official Web site
 Malcolm Smith Motorsports Foundation
 Malcolm Smith at the Motorcycle Hall of Fame
 Malcolm's autobiography

1941 births
Living people
American motorcycle racers
American racing drivers
Dakar Rally motorcyclists
Enduro riders
Off-road motorcycle racers
Sportspeople from British Columbia
Canadian motorcycle racers
Racing drivers from British Columbia
Canadian emigrants to the United States